Conor Clancy may refer to:

 Conor Clancy (Clare hurler) (born 1971)
 Conor Clancy (Offaly hurler) (born 1993)